Jonathan Woodley House is a historic home located at Little Creek, Kent County, Delaware.  It dates to the mid-19th century, and is a two-story, three bay, vernacular frame and weatherboard dwelling with a -story rear wing.  The front doorway exhibits Greek Revival style influences.  The house has been considerably altered since its listing.

It was listed on the National Register of Historic Places in 1982.

References

Houses on the National Register of Historic Places in Delaware
Greek Revival houses in Delaware
Houses in Kent County, Delaware
National Register of Historic Places in Kent County, Delaware